Lee Sang-min is a Korean name consisting of the family name Lee and the given name Sang-min, and may also refer to:

 Lee Sang-min (lawyer) (born 1965), South Korean politician
 Lee Sang-min (basketball) (born 1972), South Korean basketball player
 Lee Sang-min (singer) (born 1973), South Korean music producer and former member of Roolra
 Lee Sang-min (footballer, born 1986), South Korean footballer
 Lee Sang-min (footballer, born 1998), South Korean footballer
 Lee Sang-min (comedian) (born 1981), South Korean comedian
 Lee Sang-min (baseball) (born 1990), South Korean baseball player